Rev. James Townley (6 May 1714 – 15 July 1778) was an English dramatist, the second son of Charles Townley, a merchant.

Early life, education and marriage
Townley was born in 1714 probably at Tower Hill, London, the second son of Charles Townley, of Clapham, Surrey and Sarah Wilde, daughter of William Wilde of Long-Whatton in Leicestershire. His mother died around the time of his birth. His older brother was the officer of arms Sir Charles Townley. Following his mother's death, his father remarried and had many more children. Townley was a descendant of a younger branch of the Town(e)ley family of Towneley Hall, Burnley, Lancashire, the head of which at this time was the antiquary Charles Towneley.

He was educated at Merchant Taylors' School, London and at St. John's College, Oxford.

Around 1740, James married Jane, the daughter of Peter Bonnin of Lisbon, and they went on to have eight children: Charles, a notable engraver, James, George-Stephen, Jane, Sarah, Catherine, Mary and Elizabeth.

Career
He took holy orders, being ordained an Anglican priest on 28 May 1738. He was lecturer at St. Dunstan's in the East, chaplain to the lord mayor, then under-master at Merchant Taylors' School until 1753, when he became grammar master at Christ's Hospital. In 1760, he became head master of Merchant Taylors' School, where in 1762 and 1763 he revived the custom of dramatic performances. He retained his headmastership until his death on 5 July 1778.

He had taken a keen interest in the theatre, and it has been asserted that many of David Garrick's best productions and revivals owed much to his assistance. He was the author, although the fact was long concealed, of High Life Below Stairs, a two-act farce presented at Drury Lane on 31 October 1759; also of False Concord (Covent Garden, 20 March 1764) and The Tutor (Drury Lane, 4 February 1765).

Notes

References

External links

English dramatists and playwrights
1714 births
1778 deaths
Writers from London
Alumni of St John's College, Oxford
English male dramatists and playwrights
Headmasters of Merchant Taylors' School, Northwood